The Carretera Central (CC), meaning "Central Road", is a west-east highway spanning the length of the island of Cuba.

History
Formal construction began in 1927 during the Gerardo Machado administration. It runs along the island of Cuba from west to east, between Pinar del Río and Oriente. It is a two-way single road. It represented an extraordinary economic value during Machado and Fulgencio Batista's administrations. It facilitated faster transportation and effective inter-province commuting.

Route

Description
The Carretera Central starts in the village of La Fe, a hamlet of Sandino, in the western province of Pinar del Río, and links all major cities and province capitals except Cienfuegos.

Table
The table below shows the route of the Carretera Central. Note: Provincial seats are shown in bold; the names shown under brackets in the section "Municipality" indicate the municipal seats.

Gallery

See also

Roads in Cuba
Vía Blanca

References

External links

 Carretera Central photos
 Carretera Central on EcuRed

Roads in Cuba
Pinar del Río Province
Artemisa Province
Transport in Havana
Mayabeque Province
Matanzas Province
Villa Clara Province
Sancti Spíritus Province
Ciego de Ávila Province
Camagüey Province
Las Tunas Province
Holguín Province
Granma Province
Santiago de Cuba Province
Guantánamo Province